The Jonathan Barnes House is a historic house on North Street in Hillsborough, New Hampshire. Built about 1775, it is locally distinctive as one of only a few colonial-era houses, and is a well-preserved example of Georgian styling. It has also seen a number of socially significant uses, serving at times as a tavern, library, music school, and fraternal lodge. Surviving interior architectural details provide a significant view into the history of tavern architecture. The house was listed on the National Register of Historic Places in 1982.

Description and history
The Jonathan Barnes House stands in the rural village of Hillsborough Center, on the east side of the triangular junction of Center and North streets. It is a -story wood-frame structure, with a gabled roof, two interior chimneys, and a clapboarded exterior, and is oriented facing south. The main facade is five bays wide, with a center entrance flanked by Tuscan pilasters and topped by a transom window and gabled pediment. Windows are rectangular sash with corniced caps; that above the entrance is smaller than the others. Two additions project from the east side of the main building, one of which is also of early construction. An 18th-century barn is located on the property to the north of the house.

The interior of the house follows a typical center hall plan, with two rooms on either side of the main hall. The rooms on the west side of the hall have fixtures consistent with their use as a tavern, and the second-floor chambers above them have configurable partition walls, enabling the space to be turned into a single large ballroom.

The house was built c. 1773-75 for the Rev. Jonathan Barnes, the first settled minister of the town. Local lore says that it was built by Isaac Baldwin, a local master carpenter who lost is life in the Battle of Bunker Hill, early in the American Revolutionary War. The house has seen a wide array of uses, including as a library (founded in 1797), music school, marching band facility (1825), and Masonic lodge. The tavern-related features of the interior are among the best-preserved of their type in the region.

See also
National Register of Historic Places listings in Hillsborough County, New Hampshire

References

Houses completed in 1775
Houses on the National Register of Historic Places in New Hampshire
Georgian architecture in New Hampshire
Houses in Hillsborough County, New Hampshire
National Register of Historic Places in Hillsborough County, New Hampshire
Hillsborough, New Hampshire